Whitehurst Halt was a small railway station located on the Shrewsbury to Chester Line about a mile and a half north of Chirk in Wales, immediately on the north side of the 46-yard Whitehurst Tunnel. It was opened by the Great Western Railway as Llangollen Road Halt and the name was changed on 1 May 1906.

References

Further reading

External links
 Whitehurst Halt on navigable 1946 O.S. map

Disused railway stations in Wrexham County Borough
Former Great Western Railway stations
Railway stations in Great Britain opened in 1848
Railway stations in Great Britain closed in 1862
Railway stations in Great Britain opened in 1905
Railway stations in Great Britain closed in 1960
Chirk